Linda Allen Hollis (born 1951) is an American historian and biographer. She is a direct descendent of West Ford, who, in Ford's oral history, is the African-American son of George Washington. Her work focuses mainly on early American history and race relations.

Early life and education
Hollis was born and raised in Peoria, Illinois, in a large family of eleven children. Her mother, Elise Ford Allen, was a newspaper editor and publisher of the Traveler Weekly, and her father was an inventor and owner of the Traveler Printing Company.

Hollis attended Manual High School and received her undergraduate degree from Bradley University in Geology. She obtained her master's degree from the University of Colorado Boulder in the same discipline.

Career
Hollis started her career by joining Anaconda Mineral Company and later for several other pharmaceutical companies. She has written various books on American history, as well as on the West Ford family. She also writes as Linda Allen Bryant and L.A. Hollis.

Hollis' work focuses mainly on early American history and race relations. Her work is particularly associated with George Washington and his relationship with slavery. She written a memoir, I Cannot Tell a Lie: The True Story of George Washington's African American Descendants.

Personal life
Hollis resides in Southern California with her husband, Emerson Mark Hollis, an educator. The couple has six children together.

Publications
As Linda Allen Bryant
I Cannot Tell a Lie: The True Story of George Washington's African American Descendants (2004)
One news paper discusses this book

As L.A. Hollis
Going in Circles (2011)
Blood Virus: A Pandemic by Design (2016)

See also
West Ford

References

External links

West Ford Legacy

Living people
1951 births
Washington family
People from Peoria, Illinois
American women historians
Bradley University alumni
University of Colorado Boulder alumni